Godar Pir-e Olya (also Romanized as Godār Pīr-e ‘Olyā; also known as Godārpey-ye ‘Olyā) is a village in Sar Firuzabad Rural District, Firuzabad District, Kermanshah County, Kermanshah Province, Iran. At the 2006 census, its population was 25, in 4 families.

References

See also 
Gudar people

Populated places in Kermanshah County